Air Defence Battalion may refer to:

 Air Defence Battalion (Estonia)
 Air Defence Battalion (Lithuania)